Religion in Mozambique is diverse, with Christianity being the most widely professed faith. According to the most recent census conducted by the National Institute of Statistics in 2017, 59.8% of the population of Mozambique was Christian, 18.9% was Muslim (mainly Sunni), 13.9% had no religion, 4.8% adhered to other beliefs, and 2.5% of the population was unspecified. These figures need to be used with caution, especially those pertaining to the population that is categorised as having no religion, a significant section of whom is likely to practice traditional animist beliefs.

Religious communities are dispersed throughout the country.  The northern provinces are predominantly Muslim, particularly along the coastal strip, but some areas of the northern interior have a stronger concentration of Catholic or Protestant communities. Catholics and Protestants are generally more numerous in the southern and central regions, but Muslim minority populations are also present in these areas.

The National Directorate of Religious Affairs in the Ministry of Justice states evangelical Christians represent the fastest growing religious group in the country. Generally religious communities tend to draw their members from across ethnic, political, economic, and racial lines.

There are 732 religious denominations and 144 religious organizations registered with the Department of Religious Affairs of the Ministry of Justice. During the reporting period 10 denominations and 20 religious organizations were registered. Major Christian religious groups include Roman Catholic, Anglican, Baptist, The Church of Jesus Christ of Latter-day Saints (LDS Church), Congregational, Christadelphians, Methodist, Nazarene, Presbyterian, Jehovah's Witnesses, Seventh-day Adventist, and Universal Church of the Kingdom of God, as well as evangelical, apostolic, and Pentecostal churches. Many small, independent Protestant and Catholic churches that have split from mainstream denominations fuse African traditional beliefs and practices within a Christian framework.

Muslim journalists reported that the distinction between Sunni and Shi'a was not particularly important for many local Muslims, and Muslims were much more likely to identify themselves by the local religious leader they follow than as Sunni or Shi'a. There were significant differences between the practices of Muslims of African origin and those of South Asian background. In addition African Muslim clerics have increasingly sought training in Egypt, Kuwait, South Africa, and Saudi Arabia, returning with a more fundamental approach than the local traditional, Sufi-inspired Swahili Islam particularly common in the north. The Kuwaiti-funded and Sudanese-managed nongovernmental organization (NGO) African Muslim Agency conducted humanitarian work, as did the Muslim development agency Aga Khan.

Jewish, Hindu, and Bahá'í Faith groups are registered and constitute a very small percentage of the population.

The country's leading mosques and the Catholic Church have tried to eliminate some traditional indigenous practices from their places of worship, instituting practices that reflect a stricter interpretation of sacred texts; however, some Christian and Muslim adherents continue to incorporate traditional practices and rituals, and religious authorities have generally been permissive of such practices.

Foreign missionary groups operate freely in the country. Some groups offer religious teaching centers to their local communities, while others provide scholarships for students to study in their respective countries.

The Constitution provides for freedom of religion, and the Government generally respects this right in practice.

Survey results

Anti-Religious Campaign 1979-1982
The ruling Mozambique Liberation Front (FRELIMO), became predominantly Marxist during the liberation war. After independence, it declared state atheism and  nationalized all schools and health facilities, including those owned and run by religious institutions. Facing resistance, the new state imprisoned some clerics in 1975 and 1976 and banned all Jehovah's Witnesses in the  district of Zambezia in 1977.

In response to these and other social and religious changes,  Catholic bishops condemned the death penalty and re-education camps as godless. In 1978 the church decided to transform into a church of communities, something the state believed to be a move towards resistance to Socialism, rather than the collaboration stated by some Bishops. The result was an outright attack on all religion on the part of the state.

From early 1979, the regime attempted to discredit the church on the basis of the history of the colonial church, and it began a campaign to close churches, prevent religious activities and restrict the movements of religious staff. Catholic and other religious institutions resisted, more or less openly. By 1980, resistance was often open and  international criticism was rife, something which convinced FRELIMO to change its stance.

Several Protestant groups in Mozambique had strong allegiance to the FRELIMO government, potentially because many in the FRELIMO leadership (including the late national hero Eduardo Mondlane) had been trained in Protestant schools and the World Council of Churches had supported the Mozambique institute in Dar es Salaam during the war of liberation. But many non-Catholic churches suffered  nonetheless, not least of all  Jehovah's Witnesses, who were all deported to Zambezia and the Nazarene Church which saw many of its missionaries imprisoned.

Islam suffered probably the most during the anti-religious campaign, because of the plain misunderstanding or prejudice of the Frelimo leadership. Frelimo ministers thought, for example, that raising pigs was a good idea to combat rural  underdevelopment and  genuinely failed to understand that Muslims resistance in the north of the country came from religious objection. Some long-lasting trauma was thus created.

The Mozambican National Resistance (RENAMO) benefitted from FRELIMO's anti-religious attack. Some campaigning was done nationally and internationally by the rebel movement on the subject of religion already in 1978, but with little long-lasting impact - only some radical American and English Pentecostal groups openly sided with Renamo. The guerilla stance was indeed eventually ambiguous in relation to religious institutions, and the movement did not hesitate to take religious hostages or kill missionaries, national priests, pastors or nuns.

The anti-religious campaign of FRELIMO formally ended in 1982 when the party in power held a meeting with all the main religious institutions. On that occasion, it claimed mistakes had been made and national unity needed to prevail. State control of religious institutions continued after 1982, but the state attack on faith had come to an end.

See also

Roman Catholicism in Mozambique
Bahá'í Faith in Mozambique
Hinduism in Mozambique
Irreligion in Mozambique
Islam in Mozambique
Islamist insurgency in Cabo Delgado
Protestantism in Mozambique
Christian Council of Mozambique

References